El Silencio is a Caracas Metro station on Line 2. It was opened on 6 November 1988 as part of the extension of Line 2 from La Paz to El Silencio. The station serves as the northern terminus of the line and it is a transfer station, connected with Line 1 via Capitolio. The following station is Capuchinos. 

It is named after the El Silencio neighborhood, built by Carlos Raúl Villanueva.

In February 2019, the station burned in a large fire of unknown origin.

References

Caracas Metro stations
1988 establishments in Venezuela
Railway stations opened in 1988